As part of the EdTech boom, Online Program Managers (OPMs) provide bundled products and services on which educational institutions can run online courses. The two most notable OPMs are 2U and Academic Partnerships.

OPMs, mostly for-profit enterprises, have allowed universities to enter into the online education business and gain market share without the need to build their own platform. In effect, online program managers are also outsourcers of edtech labor. Until recently, they have also been less subject to government scrutiny.

OPMs have grown substantially as universities have seen the benefit of students reaching beyond their geographical area while recognizing their lack of skills in creating, maintaining, and optimizing online courses. Proponents of outsourcing from for-profit companies say that it "helps universities save money and makes them more nimble and efficient." Moody's Dennis Gephardt, however warns that "more and more are cutting closer to the academic core."

History
For-profit colleges are the progenitors of online program managers. In 1973, San Jose University professor John Sperling, created the Institute of Professional Development (IPD), a company servicing a few colleges. IPD was the predecessor to the University of Phoenix. Fueled by Wall Street investors, for-profit colleges gained increased market share until 2010–2011, but declined in strength afterward. OPMs increased in number and power during the decline of for-profit colleges, and they are expected to continue growing revenues for several more years. The COVID-19 pandemic accelerated the move of college courses to online format, a trend that is likely to continue. 
In 2018 and 2020 two former for-profit college companies, Kaplan Higher Education and Zovio, became online program managers. In 2021, two massive open online course (MOOC) developers, Coursera and edX, became part of the for-profit OPM business.

Scrutiny and Consolidation (2018-present)
In 2018, Inside Higher Education published "A Tipping Point for OPM?" which stated that most experts thought a "shakeout" would be occurring among Online Program Managers. Kaplan Higher Education became the OPM for Purdue University Global. Kaplan had previously owned the school.

In 2019, 2U shares dropped more than 50 percent when it lowered its growth expectations.The Century Foundation found that many universities reached bad deals with OPMs and called for the institutions to take more control over their online efforts. The Century Foundation characterized OPMs as 'predatory for-profit actors masquerading' as public universities." MOOCs were also criticized for their low completion rates, typically about 3 percent.

In early 2020, the COVID-19 pandemic forced colleges and universities to quickly move to fully online content, increasing demand for OPM support. 
OPMs gained even greater scrutiny and criticism. Senators Elizabeth Warren and Sherrod Brown called for five OPMs to disclose the terms of their contracts with colleges and universities in order to determine whether they were violating laws to safeguard consumers from predatory enrollment practices. The companies mentioned were 2U, Academic Partnerships, Bisk Education, Pearson Learning and Wiley Education Services. In an analysis of 70 schools, the Century Foundation reported that "this growing private control—which is often hidden from public view—is jeopardizing the quality of online programs, stripping control from colleges and universities, and putting students at risk of predatory behavior and abuse at the hands of for-profit companies." Noodle acquired a competitor, HotChalk. Zovio also became the OPM for The University of Arizona Global Campus, after previously owning the school once known as Ashford University.

In 2021, two MOOCS became OPMs. Coursera became a publicly traded corporation, valued at about $6 billion. 2U also announced that they would be combining forces with edX, "to create an entity that would reach 50 million learners and serve most of the best universities in the United States and the world." The acquisition cost was $800 million. An article in Slate referred to expensive online master's degrees offered by OPMs as higher education's "second biggest scam." Udemy also became a publicly traded corporation. In November 2021, the Wall Street Journal had an expose on 2U and its aggressive marketing tactics.

In 2022, a survey of chief online learning officers found that OPMs weren't "meeting their expectations for marketing and recruitment, even though these are the services the college officials said they needed most."

In 2023, the US Department of Education announced that OPMs would be subject to greater  oversight, to include audits. Higher education institutions would be required to report details about their agreements with OPMs by May 1, 2023.

Operations
According to the Hechinger report, "OPMs market the programs, recruit students, counsel them through the admissions process, enroll them, provide the software and tech support needed for the programs to function and even help instructors design online-friendly courses." In return, OPMs are entitled to portions of the revenue.  
Marketing and advertising are the largest expenses for OPMs. 2U, for example, spends $300-$400 million in marketing and advertising in a single year, and 22 percent of all tuition costs go to "customer acquisition."   Coursera spends more than one third of its revenues on sales and marketing.

In 2019, higher education analyst Kevin Carey stated:
"...OPMs are transforming both the economics and the practice of higher learning. They help a growing number of America’s most-lauded colleges provide online degrees—including Harvard, Yale, Georgetown, NYU, UC Berkeley, UNC Chapel Hill, Northwestern, Syracuse, Rice and USC, to name just a few. The schools often omit any mention of these companies on their course pages, but OPMs typically take a 60 percent cut of tuition, sometimes more."

In 2021, Coursera described an emerging strategy called the "consumer flywheel": creating stackable content and credentials from leading brand universities.

The revenue sharing model has been increasingly questioned inside and outside the industry as online learning has matured, and colleges gain more skills in this area, with some seeking a fee-for-service arrangement rather than a revenue sharing model.

Both Phil Hill and HolonIQ have also marked the increase in the fee for service market as universities select unbundled services to supplement their internal capabilities. These services are part of the evolution in the OPM space, known as Online Program Enablement (OPE or OPX).

This evolution will most likely continue in the maturation of the hybrid learning market.

See also
EdTech
For-profit higher education in the United States
Massive open online course

References

E-learning
Higher education in the United States